KPIK-LP (96.5 FM) is a low-power radio station licensed to Stayton, Oregon, United States. The station is currently owned by Santiam Community Radio Corporation.

References

External links
 

PIK-LP
PIK-LP
Marion County, Oregon
Stayton, Oregon
Radio stations established in 2003
2003 establishments in Oregon